Maccoyoceras is a genus of nautilids included in the family Trigonoceratidae from the Mississippian of North America (Michigan) and Europe.

The shell of Maccoyocerasis evolute, volutions only slightly impressed, whorl section hexagonal. Venter flattened, flanks converging, umbilical shoulder prominent. Siphuncle slender, ventral of whorl center.

References

 Barnhard Kummel, 1964. Nautiloidea - Nautilida; Treatise on Invertebrate Paleongology, Part K. Geological Society of America and University of Kansas Press.

Prehistoric nautiloid genera